Alexandra Andreyevna Orlova (born 28 August 1997 in Moscow) is a Russian freestyle skier who competed at the 2014 Winter Olympics for Russia. Orlova finished 20th in the Women's Aerials.

She participated at the 2018 Winter Olympics.

References

1997 births
Living people
Russian female freestyle skiers
Freestyle skiers at the 2014 Winter Olympics
Freestyle skiers at the 2018 Winter Olympics
Olympic freestyle skiers of Russia
Skiers from Moscow